Lecitholaxa is a genus of moths of the family Lecithoceridae.

Species
Lecitholaxa kumatai Gozmány, 1978
Lecitholaxa thiodora (Meyrick, 1914)
Lecitholaxa zopheropis (Meyrick, 1931)

External links

 
Lecithocerinae
Moth genera